Vizag Central is a shopping mall in Visakhapatnam, India, located on the Suryabagh the mall is operating with the Central Brand . The mall has cinemas, food courts, cloth stores, gaming, books, coffee shops and  restaurants. The shopping space is spread over four levels with Mukta Cinemas located on fifth floor.

The mall was launched in  2011 the owners, Future Group, all type of brands are available in this mall.

References

Shopping malls in Visakhapatnam
Shopping malls established in 2011
2011 establishments in Andhra Pradesh